Xynenon bondi is a species of beetle in the family Cerambycidae, and the only species in the genus Xynenon. It was described by Francis Polkinghorne Pascoe in 1859 and named after the entomologist Frederick Bond.

References

Pteropliini
Beetles described in 1859